Óengus Ua Gormáin was a medieval Irish bishop: he was Bishop of Down from 1117 until his death in 1123.

References

People from County Down
12th-century Roman Catholic bishops in Ireland
Bishops of Down
1123 deaths